Cyril Morley Shelford (April 8, 1921 – November 8, 2001) was a rancher, author and political figure in British Columbia. He represented Omineca from 1952 to 1972 and Skeena from 1975 to 1979 in the Legislative Assembly of British Columbia as a Social Credit member.

Biography 
He was born in Southbank, British Columbia, the son of Jack Shelford. Shelford served as an anti-aircraft gunner during World War II. After the war, he married Barbara Cassidy. Shelford was a member of the provincial cabinet, serving as Minister of Agriculture. He was defeated when he ran for reelection to the assembly in 1972 and 1979. He died in 2001.

Shelford published a number of books:
From Snowshoes To Politics 
We Pioneered 
From War To Wilderness 
Think Wood!: The Forest Is An Open Book; All We Have To Do Is Read It

References 

1921 births
2001 deaths
British Columbia candidates for Member of Parliament
British Columbia Social Credit Party MLAs
Canadian Army officers
Canadian military personnel of World War II
Canadian ranchers
Members of the Executive Council of British Columbia
People from the Regional District of Bulkley-Nechako
Social Credit Party of Canada candidates in the 1972 Canadian federal election
20th-century Canadian writers
20th-century Canadian male writers